Eucamptognathus brevicornis is a species of ground beetle in the subfamily Pterostichinae. It was described by Fairmaire in 1869.

References

Eucamptognathus
Beetles described in 1869